2001 ACC tournament may refer to:

 2001 ACC men's basketball tournament
 2001 ACC women's basketball tournament
 2001 ACC men's soccer tournament
 2001 ACC women's soccer tournament
 2001 Atlantic Coast Conference baseball tournament
 2001 Atlantic Coast Conference softball tournament